Kalaburagi district, formerly known as Gulbarga district, is one of the 31 districts of Karnataka state in southern India. Kalaburagi city is the administrative headquarters of the district. The district is the headquarters of Kalaburagi division.

This district is situated in north Karnataka between 76°.04' and 77°.42 east longitude, and 17°.12' and 17°.46' north latitude, covering an area of 10,951 km². This district is bounded on the west by Bijapur district and Solapur district of Maharashtra state, on the north by Bidar district and Osmanabad district of Maharashtra state, on the south by Yadgir district, and on the east by Sangareddy and Vikarabad districts of Telangana state.

History 
The name of the area in Kannada is Kala-buragi, meaning "stony land." In the 6th century CE, the district was under the control of the Chalukyas. The Rashtrakutas briefly conquered the area, but were driven out by the Chalukyas who ruled the area for the next two centuries. The Kalachuris then conquered the area and ruled it until 12th century, when they were driven out by the Yadavas. Afterwards it was ruled by the Kakatiyas, who ruled until 1324, when their kingdom fell to the Delhi Sultanate. The ambitions of the local governors led to the formation of the Bahmani sultanate, who made Kalaburagi their capital. The Bahmanis eventually fell and left in their place a patchwork of 5 Deccan Sultanates. Kalaburagi was ruled by the Bidar sultanate until its annexation by Bijapur in 1619. Soon the district would become part of the Mughal Empire, but the Asaf Jahi governors of the Deccan later broke away and formed their own Hyderabad State, and Kalaburagi was ruled by them. This state became a princely state of British India, until its annexation by India in 1948. Afterwards, Kalaburagi, along with Bidar and Raichur, became part of Karnataka and were known as the Kalyana-Karnataka region. Since this time, this region has continuously been lagging the rest of the state in social indicators and is considered the most backward region of Karnataka.

Economy
In 2006 the Ministry of Panchayati Raj named Kalaburagi one of the country's 243 most backward districts (out of a total of 640). It is one of the five districts in Karnataka currently receiving funds from the Backward Regions Grant Fund Programme (BRGF).

Places of interest

Historical places 
 Sannati, a small village, located on the banks of the Bhima River in Chitapur taluk is known for its Ashokan edicts, Buddhist stupa and sole surviving image of Emperor Ashoka (r. 274–232 BC) himself.
 Manyakheta, a village located on the banks of the Kagina river in Sedam taluk was the Capital city of the Rashtrakuta dynasty. This village is 40 km southeast to the District Headquarters Kalaburagi and 18 km west to the Taluk Headquarters Sedam.
 Kalaburagi Fort built in 1347 Kalaburagi's old moated fort is in a much deteriorated state, but it has a number of interesting buildings inside, including the Jama Masjid, reputed to have been built by a Moorish architect during the late 14th or early 15th century who imitated the great mosque in Cordoba, Spain. The mosque is unique in India, with a huge dome covering the whole area, four smaller ones at the corners, and 75 smaller still all the way around. The fort itself has 15 towers. Kalaburagi also has a number of imposing tombs (Haft Gumbaz) of Bahmani kings.

Geography 
The main river is the Bhima.

Subdivisions
Kalaburagi district presently comprises the following 11 talukas after the separation of Yadgir district from it.
 Kalaburagi
 Aland
 Afzalpur
 Jevargi
 Sedam
 Shahabad
 Kalgi
 Kamalapur
 Chitapur
 Chincholi
 Yedrami

Demographics 

According to the 2011 census Kalaburagi district has a population of 2,566,326, roughly equal to the nation of Kuwait or the US state of Nevada. This gives it a ranking of 162nd in India (out of a total of 640). Its population growth rate over the decade 2001-2011 was 17.94%. Gulbarga has a sex ratio of 971 females for every 1000 males, and a literacy rate of 64.85%. Scheduled Castes and Scheduled Tribes make up 25.28% and 2.54% of the population respectively.

Languages

According to the 2011 census, 65.70% of the population spoke Kannada, 18.15% Urdu, 7.09% Lambadi, 4.08% Telugu, 2.47% Marathi and 2.05% Hindi as their first language.

See also
 Yadgir (Lok Sabha constituency)
 Kalaburagi (Lok Sabha constituency)

References

External links 

 Gulbargians most interactive website
 Official Website of Gulbarga district
 Official Website of Gulbarga City Corporation
 Map of Gulbarga district

 
Districts of Karnataka
Minority Concentrated Districts in India